This is a list of musical scores composed by Dinesh Subasinghe for films and television. The list also includes musical scores prepared for documentaries and theatrical productions.

Film scores 

Post Production

Television series

Mini series

2004-2010

2011-2016

2017 -2022

Single episode television dramas and television films

Documentaries 

 'Dutu Nodutu' by Hemanalin Karunarathna for Swarnavahini
 'Jana Sarana' Soma Edirisinghe for Swarnavahini
 'Saving Energy' by Jayantha Chandrairi
 'Hethuwadhi Wimarshana' On Rupavahini
 'Suwanda Nonasena Mal by Chandrathna mapitigama
 'Pubilis' by Bertram Nihal
 'Wonder of Asia' by Jayanath Gunawardana
 'Nature Documentary' By Minuwan
 'Dalanda Maligawa'( The Temple of the Tooth)
 'Dambulla Rajamaha Viharaya' Documentary By Susara Dinal Silva
 'Se Helaye Manawa Wanshaya' on ITN

Television and radio musical series 

 Haa Haa pura on Swarnavahini 2005-2006
 Hansa vila on Swarnavahini (22 programs ) 2006
 Gee TV on Swarnavahini (5 programs) January 2006
 Maatra on Derana TV (4 programs) 2005-2007
 Sadu Naada on Swarnavahini (3 programs) 2005,2006,2008
 Love Dreams on Yfm (35 programs) 2007
 Auto Plus on Sirasa TV (2 programs) 2008
 Sikurada Rae on Derana TV (16 programs) 2008-2009
 Feeling of youth on Rupavahini (4 programs) 2014-2016
 Saara Prabha Gira on SLBC (Welanda Sewaya)-(8 Programs)
 Tone Poem On Rupavahini 2017-2018, 2019  (58 Programs)
 Baila Sade on Rupavahini 2020-2021 (27 Programs)

Main stage dramas

Passion Play 

Nadu Theenduwa (open air)                    - Peter Wellambage (1999)
Kurusiya Matha Miyadunemi (open air )         - Peter Wellambage (2000)
Kurusiya Matha Miyadunemi 2 (open air)       - Peter Wellambage (2001)
Aho Mage Senageni 3 (open air)               - Alexius Fernando (2003)
Aho Mage Senageni 4 (open air)               - Alexius Fernando (2007)
Nagoda Passion Play (open air)               - Nevil Fernando (2007)
Bolawalana Passion Play (open air)            - Peter Wellambage (2007)
Duwa Historic Passion Play (Theater)           - Clement Fernando (2008)
Seeduwa Scheme Church Good Friday passionplay  -Sanjaya Nirmal(2011)
Sri Kurusawalokanaya Passion Play (open air)  - Peter Wellambage (2012)
Aho Mage Senageni 5 (open air) Katana           -Corroborated work(2013)
Dalupotha St. Anthonie's Church Passion play   -Krishantha Warnakula(2013/2014)
Duwa Christmas play (Sirasa TV Nathal Kalapaya) (2015) - Clement Fernando
Duwa Historic Passion Play (open Air)(2016)    -Clement Fernando
Aho Mage Senegeni (open air theater)             -Corroborated work (2018)

Theater 
Mang Honda Lamaya (theater)              - Richard Manamudali (2001)
Ananga Bambaru (theater)                 - Richard Manamudali (2001)
                                         - Nevil De Silva (2002)
Memories of a Monkey Boy (theater)       - Wolfgang Stange and Anoja Weerasinghe (2007),
Siwamma Danapala (Theater)                     - Tennyson Cooray  (2012)
Beneetage Thatha  (Theater)                     -Kingsly lowes

References

Scores
Films
Film scores